Jayachandran is a surname. Notable people with the surname include:

 M. Jayachandran (born 1971), Indian film score composer, singer, and musician
 P. Jayachandran (born 1944), Indian playback singer and classical musician

Surnames of Indian origin
Indian masculine given names